Gladys is the debut studio album by German recording artist Leslie Clio. It was released by Vertigo Berlin on 8 February 2013 in German-speaking Europe.

Track listing
Credits adapted from the liner notes of Gladys.

Charts

Weekly charts

References

External links 
 Official website

2013 debut albums
Leslie Clio albums